George Claassen  is a South African journalist who was the head of department of journalism at Pretoria Technikon and Stellenbosch University. Claassen was the first academic in the field of journalism to develop a course in science and technology journalism and can rightly be called the "father of science communication in Africa" 

In 1997 he developed and established the first university course in science and technology journalism at an African university. 

He became science editor for the Afrikaans daily newspaper, Die Burger and is the founding director of Sceptic South Africa. He is occasionally referred to as the "South African Richard Dawkins."

Claassen is the director of the Centre for Science and Technology Mass Communication (CENSCOM) at the University of Stellenbosch and is the ombudsman of Media24's Community Press. He also serves as science correspondent for the SABC.

Education and career 
Claassen studied at the University of Pretoria where he completed his BA, B.Hons and MA, and attained a PhD at University of South Africa. From 1974 he worked as a journalist at Beeld newspaper in various positions as general, political, arts, science and sports reporter. After four years as sociolinguistics researcher at the Human Sciences Research Council, he joined the Department of Journalism at Pretoria Technikon, where he was Head of the Department from 1989 until 1992. Between October 1993 and the end of January 2001 he was Professor and Head of the postgraduate Department of Journalism at Stellenbosch University in the Western Cape. There he established the first course in science and technology journalism at an African university and continues to teach the course. 

Claassen is the director of the Centre for Science and Technology Mass Communication (CENSCOM) at the University of Stellenbosch. He has presented numerous courses in science and technology journalism for UNESCO in Nairobi, Addis Ababa, Pretoria and at Stellenbosch. In 2013, he designed a course in Science and Technology Journalism at the request of UNESCO, a course used worldwide. The rationale behind the course is that, in general, journalists are not trained for the task of presenting news and information about the rapidly advancing field of science. He also developed modules for the BPhil and Honours programmes on media ethics and media management.

In 2003, Claassen became the ombudsman of the Afrikaans daily newspaper published in Cape Town and Port Elizabeth, Die Burger and since 2008 he is the ombudsman of Media24's Community Press. Claassen was instrumental in establishing an ombudsman system within Media24. He has served as a board member of the international Organization of News Ombudsmen and Reader's Editors since 2011.

In July 2008, Claassen retired from the newspaper, now following a career as science journalist. He still teaches science journalism at Stellenbosch University, and presents an annual course in Science Communication to scientists at various universities. He is also the organiser of the regular 'Science meets the Media in Stellenbosch' workshops where scientists and journalists exchange ideas on how to report on science. He is also a science correspondent for the SABC.

Criticism of Leon Rousseau's work 
Until August 2008, Claassen was the Science editor at the Afrikaans daily paper Die Burger, published in Cape Town, where he wrote a weekly column on science, "Wetenskap vandag" (Science Today). His review of Leon Rousseau's Die Groot Avontuur (The Big Adventure), a book on evolution, sparked an intense debate in Afrikaans newspapers for his criticism of the eminent evolutionary scientist, Prof. Phillip Tobias, for writing an "Avant Propos" for Rousseau's book. Claassen's main criticism of the book was that it supported the idea of evolution by Intelligent Design. Tobias later recanted and distanced himself unequivocally from the Intelligent Design parts of the book in a letter published in Die Burger.

Recognition 
 In May 2007 Claassen was the first winner of the SAASTA South African Science Communicator of the Year Award, presented by the National Science and Technology Forum.

 He was awarded the inaugural Media Lifetime Achievement Award by Stellenbosch University in 2019.

Selected publications

Books
Claassen is the author or co-author of 14 books, including Geloof, Bygeloof en Ander Wensdenkery – Perspektiewe oor Ontdekkings en Irrasionaliteite (Faith, Superstition and Other Wishful Thinking – Perspectives on Discoveries and Irrationalities) that was published by Protea Boekhuis in July 2007 and in February 2008 went into a second printing. In 2014, his book on quackery, Kwakke, Kwinte & Kwale: Hoe 'n Onsinverklikker Jou Lewe Kan Red was released.

His works include:
 'n Historiese Blik op die Lae Lande, HAUM, 1982

 (This historical novel was on the Beeld topseller's list in 1988)

Articles
Claassen has written numerous articles on various topics surrounding the media and ethics including:

Scylla and Charybdis: The rocks of rumour threatening journalism
Dealing with racism and the serpent of confirmation bias
How a journalist took an ethical stand and risked her job

Social media 
Claassen was active on a blog called Prometheus Unbound (hosted on WordPress) and from 2009 on a blog called Prometheus Liberated, however both are now defunct. Since 2011 he has been active on Twitter.

Personal life 
Claassen's parents were Petronella Claassen (née Theunissen) and George Nicolaas Claassen,  a schoolmaster from Middelburg Hoërskool and South African athlete who won the 1961 Comrades Marathon. He is one of four children, the others being Danie, Maryna and Wynand, who captained the Springboks in the 1980s.

Claassen is married and has three children.

References

External links 
 Centre for Science and Technology Mass Communication
 George Claassen at bookdepository.com

South African journalists
University of Pretoria alumni
Living people
South African male novelists
1949 births
Academic staff of Tshwane University of Technology
University of South Africa alumni
Academic staff of Stellenbosch University